K R Sunil (born 1975) is a visual artist and film companion who lives in Kochi. The first photography exhibition series Red Devotion was at Durbal Hall, Ernakulam in 2008. His second series was based on an old port town in Kerala, Ponnani. It is a cross-section cultural reflections of Malabar in contemporary Northern Kerala society. The series, Vanishing Life Worlds widely recognized him through its exhibition at the third edition of Kochi-Muziris Biennale in 2016, curated by Sudarshan Shetty
He has participated in the curatorial exhibition of Mattancherry by artist and curator Riyas Komu. Mattancherry photography series gazes the subaltern livelihood with a concrete ethnographic document to the contemporary cultural historiography Kerala. Mattancherry Island is a major hub of many waves of sea root connections from various parts of the world.

Vanishing Life Worlds (2016)
The series was exhibited at the Kochi-Muziris Biennale in 2016.

Chronicle of a Disappearance (2016)
The series was exhibited at the India Habitat Centre Delhi in 2016, curated by Alka Pandey, and at RMIT Gallery, Melbourne in 2017, which was curated by Suzanne Davies & Helen Reyment.

Mattancherry (2017)
The series was exhibited at the Uru Art Harbour, Kochi in 2017, curated by Riyas Komu.

Manchukkar- The Seafarers of Malabar (2018)
The series was exhibited at the Uru Art Harbour, Kochi in 2017, curated by Riyas Komu, and at the Clarinda Carnegie Art Museum, USA| 2021 | Curated by Karen and Robert Duncan. Furthermore, Kunstdepot Göschenen, Switzerland published the series as a catalog in 2021.

Home (2020)
The series was exhibited at Lokame Tharavadu (The World is One Family), Alapuzha in 2021, which was curated by Bose Krishnamachari

References

External links 

1975 births
Living people
Interdisciplinary artists
Artists from Kerala
Indian contemporary artists
Indian multimedia artists
21st-century Indian artists
Indian photographers